Konstantin Petrovich Baranov (born January 11, 1982) is a Russian professional ice hockey player who currently plays for HC Sarov of the Russian Major League (VHL). He was selected by the Philadelphia Flyers in the 4th round (126th overall) of the 2002 NHL Entry Draft.

Career statistics

External links

1982 births
Amur Khabarovsk players
Avangard Omsk players
HC CSKA Moscow players
HC Dynamo Moscow players
HC Lada Togliatti players
Metallurg Novokuznetsk players
Living people
Sportspeople from Omsk
Philadelphia Flyers draft picks
Russian ice hockey right wingers
Salavat Yulaev Ufa players
SKA Saint Petersburg players